Mohra Sher Shah is a village in District Mirpur (Tehsil Dadyal) of Azad Kashmir, Pakistan.

Demography 
According to 1998 census of Pakistan, its population was 333.

History 
Like many villages in the Muzaffarabad region, many villagers have emigrated to the United Kingdom.

References 

Mirpur District
Populated places in Mirpur District